Artan Vila (born 4 May 1970) is a retired Albanian football defender.

Club career
Vila played the majority of his career for hometown club Teuta Durrës, with whom he won the 1994 league title.

International career
He made his debut for Albania in a November 1996 FIFA World Cup qualification match against Armenia in Tirana and earned a total of 2 caps, scoring no goals. His other international game was a June 1997 World Cup qualification match against Portugal.

Honours
Albanian Superliga: 1
 1994

References

1970 births
Living people
Footballers from Durrës
Albanian footballers
Association football defenders
Albania international footballers
KF Teuta Durrës players
Besa Kavajë players
Kategoria Superiore players